Robert Alexander McCullough IV (born May 26, 1977) is an American former Muay Thai kickboxer and professional mixed martial artist. A professional from 2001-2011 in MMA, McCullough has formerly competed for the WEC, Bellator, DREAM, the World Fighting Alliance, the Palace Fighting Championship, and King of the Cage. In professional kickboxing, McCullough has competed for K-1.

Mixed martial arts career

World Extreme Cagefighting
McCullough began his mixed martial arts career with a first-round TKO victory at the Palace Casino in Lemoore, California, in 2001.  Between 2003 and 2007, "Razor Rob" went 10-1 with nine stoppage victories and only a split-decision loss to Harris Sarmiento, which he later avenged.

McCullough defeated Muay Thai fighter Kit Cope at WEC 25 to win the vacant WEC Lightweight Championship.  He defended the title once by defeating Richard Crunkilton by first-round TKO.  On February 13, 2008, he lost his title to Jamie Varner when Varner defeated him by TKO due to strikes in the third round.

After losing his title, McCullough struggled over his next four fights in the now-defunct WEC. He defeated Kenneth Alexander by split decision but then lost to Donald Cerrone.  He defeated Marcus Hicks by majority decision, but he fractured his right hand and received minor damage to his ankle and subsequently underwent surgery to repair his hand.  McCullough was expected to return to the cage against Anthony Pettis on November 18, 2009, at WEC 44; but Pettis had to pull out of the bout with an undisclosed injury. McCullough instead faced WEC newcomer Karen Darabedyan.  McCullough lost to Darabedyan via split decision.

With three losses in his last five fights, McCullough released by the WEC and would eventually join Tachi Palace Fights, returning to the venue where his career began, and had somewhat of a resurgence. McCullough defeated Isaac de Jesus by first-round TKO on July 9, 2010, at Tachi Palace Fight 5. He then defeated UFC veteran Corey Hill by unanimous decision on September 9, 2010, at Tachi Palace Fight 6.

Bellator MMA
On October 14, 2010, McCullough signed with Bellator to compete in the promotion's upcoming Season Four Lightweight Tournament. He was knocked out by a counter right by Patricky "The Pitbull" Freire.

DREAM
McCullough next faced Shinya Aoki at DREAM 17. He lost the fight via submission in the first round.

Personal life
McCullough was married to Kristina McCullough. The couple had their first child, a son, in March 2010 and second child, a son born in November 2014.

Divorced Kristina McCullough in May, 2020 and is now engaged to FightCamp Trainer Shanie Rusth.

He is of Irish and Mexican descent.

McCullough also owns MMA apparel company Razor Clothing.

Championships and accomplishments
World Extreme Cagefighting
WEC Lightweight Championship (One time)
One successful title defense

Kickboxing record 

|-
|-  bgcolor="#FFBBBB"
| 2004-08-07 || Loss ||align=left| James Martinez || K-1 World Grand Prix 2004 in Las Vegas II || Las Vegas, Nevada, USA || TKO || 1 || 1:53
|-
|-  bgcolor="#CCFFCC"
| 2004-04-30 || Win ||align=left| John Polakowski || K-1 World Grand Prix 2004 in Las Vegas I || Las Vegas, Nevada, USA || TKO || 2 || 2:38 
|-
|-  bgcolor="#CCFFCC"
| 1997 || Win ||align=left| Gary Owens || I.S.K.A Jr Welterweight State Kickboxing Championship || San Jose, California, USA || TKO || 2 || 
|-
|-  bgcolor="#CCFFCC"
| 1997 - 1999 || Win ||align=left| Eddie Wedding || U.W.M.T.A Welterweight U.S. Champion || Sequoia Conference Center, Buena Park, California USA || KO ||  || 
|-
|-  bgcolor="#CCFFCC"
| 1997 - 1999 || Win ||align=left| William Syripai || U.W.M.T.A Welterweight U.S. Champion || Sequoia Conference Center, Buena Park, California USA || DEC ||  || 
|-
|-  bgcolor="#CCFFCC"
| 1997 - 1999 || Win ||align=left| Mitch Milat || U.W.M.T.A Welterweight U.S. Champion || Sequoia Conference Center, Buena Park, California USA || KO ||  || 
|-
|-  bgcolor="#CCFFCC"
| 1997 - 1999 || Win ||align=left| Javier Janjira || U.W.M.T.A Welterweight U.S. Champion|| Whittier Hilton, Whittier California USA || KO ||  || 
|-
|-  bgcolor="#CCFFCC"
| 1997 - 1999 || Win ||align=left| Phally Rin || U.W.M.T.A Welterweight U.S. Champion || Sequoia Conference Center, Buena Park, California USA || DEC ||  || 
|-
|-  bgcolor="#CCFFCC"
| 1998 || Win ||align=left| Lee Hua || I.K.K.C Jr Welterweight U.S. Champion || Crystal Park Casino, California USA || DEC ||  || 
|-
|-  bgcolor="#CCFFCC"
| 1998 || Win ||align=left|  || I.A.M.T.F Welterweight U.S. Champion  || Maywood, California USA || DEC ||  || 
|-
|-  bgcolor="#CCFFCC"
| 1998 || Win ||align=left| Scott Thorson || I.K.B.A Welterweight International Kickboxing Champion || Whittier, California USA || DEC ||  || 
|-
|-
| colspan=9 | Legend:

Mixed martial arts record

|-
| Loss
| align=center| 19–8
| Shinya Aoki
| Submission (neck crank)
| DREAM 17
| 
| align=center| 1
| align=center| 4:57
| Saitama, Japan
| 
|-
| Loss
| align=center| 19–7
| Patricky Freire
| TKO (punches)
| Bellator 36
| 
| align=center| 3
| align=center| 3:11
| Shreveport, Louisiana, United States
| 
|-
| Win
| align=center| 19–6
| Corey Hill
| Decision (unanimous)
| TPF 6: High Stakes
| 
| align=center| 3
| align=center| 5:00
| Lemoore, California, United States
| 
|-
| Win
| align=center| 18–6
| Isaac DeJesus
| TKO (punches)
| TPF 5: Stars and Strikes
| 
| align=center| 1
| align=center| 4:31
| Lemoore, California, United States
| 
|-
| Loss
| align=center| 17–6
| Karen Darabedyan
| Decision (split)
| WEC 44
| 
| align=center| 3
| align=center| 5:00
| Las Vegas, Nevada, United States
| 
|-
| Win
| align=center| 17–5
| Marcus Hicks
| Decision (majority)
| WEC 39
| 
| align=center| 3
| align=center| 5:00
| Corpus Christi, Texas, United States
| 
|-
| Loss
| align=center| 16–5
| Donald Cerrone
| Decision (unanimous)
| WEC 36
| 
| align=center| 3
| align=center| 5:00
| Hollywood, Florida, United States
| 
|-
| Win
| align=center| 16–4
| Kenneth Alexander
| Decision (split)
| WEC 34
| 
| align=center| 3
| align=center| 5:00
| Sacramento, California, United States
| 
|-
| Loss
| align=center| 15–4
| Jamie Varner
| TKO (punches)
| WEC 32
| 
| align=center| 3
| align=center| 2:54
| Rio Rancho, New Mexico, United States
| 
|-
| Win
| align=center| 15–3
| Richard Crunkilton
| TKO (punches)
| WEC 30
| 
| align=center| 1
| align=center| 1:29
| Las Vegas, Nevada, United States
| 
|-
| Win
| align=center| 14–3
| Kit Cope
| Submission (punches)
| WEC 25
| 
| align=center| 1
| align=center| 2:53
| Las Vegas, Nevada, United States
| 
|-
| Win
| align=center| 13–3
| Harris Sarmiento
| Decision (unanimous)
| WFA: King of the Streets
| 
| align=center| 3
| align=center| 5:00
| Los Angeles, California, United States
| 
|-
| Win
| align=center| 12–3
| Ryan Healy
| TKO (cut)
| WEC 21
| 
| align=center| 1
| align=center| 1:52
| Highland, California, United States
| 
|-
| Win
| align=center| 11–3
| Randy Hauer
| TKO (punches)
| WEC 20
| 
| align=center| 1
| align=center| 2:36
| Lemoore, California, United States
| 
|-
| Win
| align=center| 10–3
| Olaf Alfonso
| KO (punch)
| WEC 19
| 
| align=center| 2
| align=center| 0:12
| Lemoore, California, United States
| 
|-
| Win
| align=center| 9–3
| Gabe Rivas
| Submission (verbal)
| KOTC 63
| 
| align=center| 2
| align=center| 3:11
| San Jacinto, California, United States
| 
|-
| Win
| align=center| 8–3
| Jeremy Jones
| TKO (punches)
| KOTC 58
| 
| align=center| 1
| align=center| 0:45
| San Jacinto, California, United States
| 
|-
| Win
| align=center| 7–3
| Andrew Williams
| TKO (punches)
| PFC: Pit Fighting Championship
| 
| align=center| 1
| align=center| N/A
| Upland, California, United States
| 
|-
| Loss
| align=center| 6–3
| Harris Sarmiento
| Decision (split)
| WEC 9
| 
| align=center| 3
| align=center| 5:00
| Lemoore, California, United States
| 
|-
| Win
| align=center| 6–2
| Danny Devine
| TKO (leg kicks)
| PFC: Put Up or Shut Up
| 
| align=center| 1
| align=center| N/A
| Upland, California, United States
| 
|-
| Win
| align=center| 5–2
| Nam Phan
| Decision (unanimous)
| PFC: Knucklefest
| 
| align=center| 2
| align=center| 5:00
| California, United States
| 
|-
| Win
| align=center| 4–2
| Anthony Garcia
| KO (punches)
| PFC: Knucklefest
| 
| align=center| 1
| align=center| N/A
| California, United States
| 
|-
| Win
| align=center| 3–2
| William Sriyapai
| Decision (unanimous)
| PFC: Knucklefest
| 
| align=center| 1
| align=center| 5:00
| California, United States
| 
|-
| Loss
| align=center| 2–2
| Josh Thomson
| Decision (unanimous)
| WFA 3: Level 3
| 
| align=center| 3
| align=center| 5:00
| Las Vegas, Nevada, United States
| 
|-
| Loss
| align=center| 2–1
| Kenneth Alexander
| Decision (unanimous)
| HFP 1: Rumble on the Reservation
| 
| align=center| 4
| align=center| 3:00
| Anza, California, United States
| 
|-
| Win
| align=center| 2–0
| Steve Wagner
| TKO (corner stoppage)
| Ultimate Pankration 1
| 
| align=center| 1
| align=center| 3:55
| Cabazon, California, United States
| 
|-
| Win
| align=center| 1–0
| Jesse Heck
| TKO (punches)
| WEC 2
| 
| align=center| 1
| align=center| 0:24
| Lemoore, California, United States
|

See also
 List of Bellator MMA alumni

References

External links

Rob McCullough on Myspace

Living people
1977 births
American male kickboxers
Kickboxers from California
American male mixed martial artists
Mixed martial artists from California
Lightweight mixed martial artists
Mixed martial artists utilizing Muay Thai
Mixed martial artists utilizing Brazilian jiu-jitsu
American Muay Thai practitioners
American practitioners of Brazilian jiu-jitsu
American mixed martial artists of Mexican descent
World Extreme Cagefighting champions
Sportspeople from Huntington Beach, California